is the thirty-first single of J-pop group Morning Musume, released on November 8, 2006. "Aruiteru" sold approximately 55,694 copies and reached number one in both the daily and weekly Oricon charts.
There are three different versions of the single. Limited edition A includes a bonus DVD and has catalog number EPCE-5433~4. Limited edition B comes in a special package with a 36-page photo booklet and has catalog number EPCE-5435. The regular edition has catalog number EPCE-5436. The first press of this edition has a photo card included.

The Single V was released on November 15, 2006.

Details 
 The single is different from the past few singles, which have had an upbeat tempo.
 The songwriter of the song Tsunku also released a soft rock version of the song with his band Sharam Q as a single. 

 This was their first #1 single (Oricon) since "As for One Day", making it the first for the group's 6th (Sayumi Michishige, Eri Kamei, Reina Tanaka, Miki Fujimoto) and 7th (Koharu Kusumi) generations.
 With this single, they surpassed Pink Lady (after a tie of approximately three years) for most number one singles by a female group.

Track listings

CD 
 
 
 "Aruiteru" (Instrumental)

Limited Edition A DVD 
 "Aruiteru (Walk Ver.)"

Single V DVD 
 "Aruiteru"
 "Aruiteru (Close -up Ver.)"

Members at time of single 
 4th generation: Hitomi Yoshizawa
 5th generation: Ai Takahashi, Risa Niigaki
 6th generation: Miki Fujimoto, Eri Kamei, Sayumi Michishige, Reina Tanaka
 7th generation: Koharu Kusumi

References

External links 
 Aruiteru entry on the Up-Front Works official website

2006 singles
Morning Musume songs
Oricon Weekly number-one singles
Song recordings produced by Tsunku
Songs written by Tsunku
Zetima Records singles